Iron Shark is a steel roller coaster at Galveston Island Historic Pleasure Pier. The Gerstlauer Euro-Fighter roller coaster opened to the public on June 1, 2012. Iron Shark was the first Euro-Fighter coaster in Texas. The ride was installed by Ride Entertainment Group, who handles all of Gerstlauer's operations in the Western Hemisphere.

Ride
Iron Shark is a Euro-Fighter by German company Gerstlauer. The ride features 4 inversions.

The ride begins with a slight left turn out of the station. It then proceeds up a  vertical lift hill. After peaking the hill, the ride enters into a beyond vertical drop at 95 degrees. The train then enters an Immelmann loop followed by a dive loop. A short stretch of high speed "S" curves lead the train into a cutback followed by an inclined loop. As the train completes the inclined loop, it reaches the brake run. The ride then features the last 180 degree turn into the station.

See also
 2012 in amusement parks

References

Galveston Island Historic Pleasure Pier
Euro-Fighter roller coasters
Roller coasters in Texas
2012 establishments in Texas